Detlef Altenburg (9 January 1947 – 8 February 2016) was a German musicologist.

Life and career 
Born in Hersfeld, Altenburg studied musicology, Protestant theology, religious studies and philosophy in University of Marburg and University of Cologne, where he received his doctorate in 1973. He remained there as Wissenschaftlicher Assistent and habilitated in 1980. In 1980/81 he took over a substitute professorship at the University of Göttingen. In 1983 he held a visiting professorship at the New University of Lisbon. In 1999 he accepted an appointment at the Hochschule für Musik Franz Liszt, Weimar and was director of the joint institute for musicology of the HfM Weimar and the Friedrich-Schiller-Universität Jena from November 1999 until his retirement. His scientific work focused on music of the 17th and 18th centuries as well as music and musical views of the 19th century. Numerous publications by Altenburg concerned Franz Liszt.

From 2001 to 2009 Altenburg was president of the Gesellschaft für Musikforschung. Besides, he belonged to the presidency of the Deutscher Musikrat from 2003 to 2009. Furthermore, he was member of the  since 2000 and since 2006 full member of the Sächsische Akademie der Wissenschaften. He was a member of the Academia Europaea.

Altenburg died in Regensburg at age 69.

Publications 
See Altenburg on WorldCat

Honours and awards 
 Bundesverdienstkreuz am Bande of the Order of Merit of the Federal Republic of Germany (2010)

References

External links 
 

1947 births
2016 deaths
20th-century German musicologists
21st-century German musicologists
Members of Academia Europaea
Academic staff of Paderborn University
People from Bad Hersfeld
Recipients of the Cross of the Order of Merit of the Federal Republic of Germany
Academic staff of the University of Göttingen
Academic staff of the University of Regensburg